Stowell House, also known as Stowell Residence, at 225 Robineau Road in Syracuse, New York, is a home designed by Ward Wellington Ward.  It may be the only stone house designed by Ward and also included in the Ward MPS.

It was listed on the National Register of Historic Places in 1997.

References

Houses in Syracuse, New York
National Register of Historic Places in Syracuse, New York
Houses on the National Register of Historic Places in New York (state)
Houses completed in 1919
Colonial Revival architecture in New York (state)